Revenge! is a live album by the jazz bassist and composer Charles Mingus, recorded in 1964 in Paris and issued on many bootleg releases before being legitimately released on the Revenge label in 1996.

Reception
AllMusic's Scott Yanow called the album "a highly recommended release".

Track listing
All compositions by Charles Mingus

Disc One:
 "Peggy's Blue Skylight" – 12:53
 "Orange Was the Color of Her Dress, Then Blue Silk" – 11:38
 "Meditations on Integration" – 22:39
 "Fables of Faubus" – 24:53 	
Disc Two:
 "So Long Eric" – 28:50
 "Parkeriana" – 24:13

Personnel
Charles Mingus – bass
Johnny Coles – trumpet (Disc Two, track 1)
Eric Dolphy – alto saxophone, bass clarinet, flute
Clifford Jordan – tenor saxophone 
Jaki Byard – piano
Dannie Richmond – drums

References

Charles Mingus live albums
1996 live albums